Mount Weihaupt is a large, bare mountain (2,285 m) which stands 10 miles (16 km) east of Mount Bower and is the dominant feature in the east part of the Outback Nunataks. It was first mapped by the U.S. Victoria Land Traverse party, 1959–60, and named by the Advisory Committee on Antarctic Names (US-ACAN) for John G. Weihaupt, seismologist with this party. A detailed account of the Victoria Land Traverse appears in the Geological Society of America's SPECIAL PUBLICATION 488, dated 2012.

References

Mountains of Victoria Land
Pennell Coast